She is is a 2019 Nollywood movie co-produced by Omawumi and Waje featuring a successful woman who after coming of age needs to choose a husband. She faced a lot of challenges before getting a groom. It was directed by Chris Eneng Enaji.

The premier of the film took place at film house Cinema IMAX, Lekki on March 8, 2019, and it was released March 15, 2019. Some actors and dignitaries that attended the premier include Banky W., ⁣Toke Makinwa and Shaffy Bello.

Plot 
Frances at the peak of her career decided to settle down due to  pressures from family and friends. To add to it, she is in danger of losing her womb due to a fibroid, leaving her with the choice of becoming pregnant or having surgery.

Cast 

Somkele Iyamah-Idhalama as Akunna
Chiwetalu Agu as chief Amosun
Ime Bishop Umoh as Tobia
Mawuli Gavor as Rowland
Ray Emodi as pastor Jude
Linda Ejiofor as Erimma
Desmond Elliot as Dr Gerald
Segun Arinze as Dr Mark
Uzo Arukwe as Pastor Chike
Blessing Onwukwe as Sis Sarah
Frank Donga

Reception 
The film according to fans enlighten women on the options available to get pregnant without been married such as IVF and surrogacy.

See also
List of Nigerian films of 2019

References 

Nigerian drama films
2019 films
English-language Nigerian films